The 1981 Cleveland Browns season was the team's 32nd season with the National Football League.
In a highly disappointing season filled with a number of key injuries at different stretches during the campaign, the Browns finished the year with five straight defeats, their longest losing streak since 1975, and dropped seven of their final eight games. By contrast, in 1980, the Browns enjoyed a five-game winning streak.

The last remaining active member of the 1981 Cleveland Browns was linebacker Clay Matthews, who retired after the 1996 season.

Season summary 
The Browns had a similar kind of season in 1981—eight of the games were decided by six points or less, and five were decided by three points or less. Sipe threw more interceptions (25) than TDs (17), his completion rate fell to just over 55 percent and his quarterback rating plummeted to 68.2. FB Mike Pruitt rushed for more than 1,000 yards (1,103) for the third straight year in 1981, and caught 63 passes for the second season in a row. Tight end Ozzie Newsome set a team record (since broken) for receptions with 69 and had the second-most receiving yards in Browns history at the time with 1,002.

HB Greg Pruitt established a personal best with 65 catches.

Ironically, through the 2021 NFL season the 1981 Browns are the only team since the AFL-NFL merger in 1970 to have beaten both eventual Super Bowl participants, the Super Bowl champion San Francisco 49ers and the AFC Champion Cincinnati Bengals, in the regular season while finishing with a losing record.

Offseason

NFL Draft 
The following were selected in the 1981 NFL Draft.

Regular season

Schedule

Note: Intra-division opponents are in bold text.

Standings

Personnel

Staff / Coaches

Roster

Game summaries

Week 4: vs. Atlanta

References

External links 
 1981 Cleveland Browns at Pro Football Reference
 1981 Cleveland Browns Statistics at jt-sw.com
 1981 Cleveland Browns Schedule at jt-sw.com
 1981 Cleveland Browns at DatabaseFootball.com  

Cleveland
Cleveland Browns seasons
Cleveland